The T1 was the first tramcar based on the American Presidents' Conference Committee concept, produced by Czechoslovakian company ČKD Tatra. 287 multiple T1 units were built between 1952 and 1958. Most of them were used in Czechoslovakia, but 22 were shipped abroad: 2 to Warsaw and the remaining 20 to Rostov-on-Don.

The first prototype of T1, T1 TW 5001, which today is considered the forefather of all Tatra trams, premiered in the streets of Prague on 22 January 1951. It is now on exhibition in the Prague Museum Depot (Muzeum Vozovna Střešovice) in Střešovice. The cars remained in use into the 1960s, when they were converted into T3-type vehicles. The last T1 was retired on 4 April 1987, in Plzeň.

Production
New Tatra T1 units were delivered to the following cities:

Photo gallery

References

External links 

Tatra trams
Tram vehicles of the Czech Republic
Tram vehicles of Poland